Eugene A. Derby  (February 3, 1860 – February 13, 1917) was a baseball catcher, who appeared in ten games for the 1885 Baltimore Orioles of the American Association. He continued to play in the minor leagues through 1891.

External links

1860 births
1917 deaths
Baltimore Orioles (AA) players
19th-century baseball players
Lancaster Ironsides players
Norfolk (minor league baseball) players
Waterbury Brassmen players
Newark Little Giants players
Worcester Grays players
Hartford (minor league baseball) players
Troy Trojans (minor league) players